Throssell is a surname. Notable people with the surname include:

 Brianna Throssell (born 1996), Australian swimmer
 George Throssell (1840–1910), premier of Western Australia for the second ministry of the Government of Western Australia
 Hugo Throssell (1884–1933), his son and Victoria Cross recipient
 Ric Throssell (1922–1999), Australian diplomat and author; son of Hugo Throssell

See also
 Throssell, Western Australia, a town in the Shire of Northam